Ben Betts may refer to:
 Ben Betts (basketball)
 Ben Betts (rugby union)